Ben Webster Meets Oscar Peterson is a 1960 studio album featuring a jazz trio, led by the Canadian jazz pianist Oscar Peterson, with the tenor saxophonist Ben Webster.

Reception

Writing for AllMusic, critic Stephen Cook wrote "Another fine Webster release on Verve that sees the tenor great once again backed by the deluxe Oscar Peterson Trio... to reassure Peterson fans worried about scant solo time for their hero, the pianist lays down a healthy number of extended runs, unobtrusively shadowing Webster's vaporous tone and supple phrasing along the way. Not only a definite first-disc choice for Webster newcomers, but one of the jazz legend's all-time great records."

Track listing
"The Touch of Your Lips" (Ray Noble)  – 6:20
"When Your Lover Has Gone" (Einar Aaron Swan)  – 3:59
"Bye Bye Blackbird" (Mort Dixon, Ray Henderson)  – 6:45
"How Deep Is the Ocean?" (Irving Berlin)  – 2:36
"In the Wee Small Hours of the Morning" (Bob Hilliard, David Mann)  – 3:13
"Sunday" (Chester Conn, Benny Krueger, Nathan "Ned" Miller, Jule Styne)  – 3:57
"This Can't Be Love" (Lorenz Hart, Richard Rodgers)  – 9:51

Personnel 
Oscar Peterson - piano
Ben Webster - tenor saxophone
Ray Brown - double bass
Ed Thigpen - drums

References

Oscar Peterson albums
Ben Webster albums
1960 albums
Verve Records albums
Albums produced by Norman Granz